Klinkit Lake Peak is a tuya in northwestern British Columbia, Canada, located near Klinkit Lake. It lies in the Northern Cordilleran Volcanic Province and last erupted during the Pleistocene epoch.

See also
List of volcanoes in Canada
List of Northern Cordilleran volcanoes
Volcanism of Canada
Volcanism of Western Canada

References

Volcanoes of British Columbia
Mountains of British Columbia
Pleistocene volcanoes
Tuyas of Canada